National Highway 927 (NH 927) is a  National Highway in India.

References

National highways in India
Transport in Barabanki, Uttar Pradesh
Transport in Nepal